Easter cakes are cakes or sweet breads traditionally prepared and served during the Easter season. They are traditionally associated with the Catholic, Greek Orthodox, and Russian Orthodox churches and also with some other Christian churches in Northern Europe.

Types

Babka

 Easter babka is a yeast cake that is part of Poland's Easter traditions. Made with raisins, and other dried and candied fruits, the cake is soaked in rum syrup before it's served.

Choerek 
Chorek is a Georgian sweet Easter bread flavored with aniseed and braided into the shape of snails or wreaths.

Hot cross buns
In England the most popular Easter bread is the hot cross bun.

Kulich

In Russia kulich is baked on Holy Thursday. Holy Saturday is strictly a fast day; nothing is eaten and there is a church service at midnight and Easter Mass at dawn. The kulich is blessed and it is taken home and eaten with paskha and other foods for a big breakfast with the family. According to Alan Davidson it is "the most famous Russian Easter bread."

Lamala
Lamala is an Alsatian paschal lamb cake that is a traditional Easter cake of the Alsace region of France. It is made using a special mold.

Mazurek

 Mazurek is a Polish easter cake made with short pastry with butter cake "glued" together with a layer of marmalade.

Simnel cake
Simnel cake has become associated with the Easter season, but according to Davidson it was not always traditional to Easter.

Literary mentions
Anton Chekov's The Cossack is a story about a newly married couple and a blessed loaf Easter cake.

See also
Easter bread

References